An alternate reality game (ARG) is an interactive networked narrative that uses the real world as a platform and employs transmedia storytelling to deliver a story that may be altered by players' ideas or actions.

The form is defined by intense player involvement with a story that takes place in real time and evolves according to players' responses. It is shaped by characters that are actively controlled by the game's designers, as opposed to being controlled by an AI as in a computer or console video game. Players interact directly with characters in the game, solve plot-based challenges and puzzles, and collaborate as a community to analyze the story and coordinate real-life and online activities. ARGs generally use multimedia, such as telephones and mail, but rely on the Internet as the central binding medium.

ARGs tend to be free to play, with costs absorbed either through supporting products (e.g., collectible puzzle cards fund Perplex City) or through promotional relationships with existing products (for example, I Love Bees was a promotion for Halo 2, and the Lost Experience and Find 815 promoted the television show Lost). Pay-to-play models exist as well. Later games in the genre have shown an increasing amount of experimentation with new models and sub-genres.

Definition 
There is a great deal of debate surrounding the characteristics by which the term "alternate reality game" should be defined.  Sean Stacey, the founder of the website Unfiction, has suggested that the best way to define the genre was not to define it, and instead locate each game on three axes (ruleset, authorship and coherence) in a sphere of "chaotic fiction" that would include works such as the Uncyclopedia and street games like SF0 as well.

Several experts, though, point to the use of transmedia, "the aggregate effect of multiple texts/media artifacts," as the defining attribute of ARGs.  This prompts the unique collaboration emanating from ARGs as well; Sean Stewart, founder of 42 Entertainment, which has produced various successful ARGs, speaks to how this occurs, noting that "the key thing about an ARG is the way it jumps off of all those platforms.  It's a game that's social and comes at you across all the different ways that you connect to the world around you."

Unique terminology 
Among the terms essential to understanding discussions about ARGs are:
 Puppet-master – A puppet-master or "PM" is an individual involved in designing and/or running an ARG. Puppet-masters are simultaneously allies and adversaries to the player base, creating obstacles and providing resources for overcoming them in the course of telling the game's story. Puppet-masters generally remain behind the curtain while a game is running.  The real identity of puppet-masters may or may not be known ahead of time.
 The Curtain – The curtain, drawing from the phrase, "Pay no attention to the man behind the curtain," is generally a metaphor for the separation between the puppet-masters and the players. This can take the traditional form of absolute secrecy regarding the puppet-masters' identities and involvement with the production, or refer merely to the convention that puppet-masters do not communicate directly with players through the game, interacting instead through the characters and the game's design.
 Rabbit-hole/Trailhead – A rabbit-hole, or trailhead, marks the first media artifact, be it a website, contact, or puzzle, that draws in players.  Most ARGs employ a number of trailheads in several media to maximize the probability of people discovering the game.  Typically, the rabbit-hole is a website, the most easily updated, cost-effective option.
 This Is Not A Game (TINAG) – Setting the ARG form apart from other games is the This Is Not A Game sentiment popularized by the players themselves.  It is the belief that "one of the main goals of the ARG is to deny and disguise the fact that it is even a game at all."

Similarities to and differences from other forms of entertainment 
 Computer/console/video games. While ARGs generally use the internet as a central binding medium, they are not played exclusively on a computer and usually do not require the use of special software or interfaces. Non-player characters in ARGs are controlled in real time by the puppet-masters, not computer algorithms.
 Role-playing games (RPGs) and live action role-playing games (LARPs). The role of the puppet-master in creating ARG narratives and the puppet-master's relationship with an ARG's players bears a great deal of similarity to the role of a game master or referee in a role-playing game. However, the role of the players is quite different. Most ARGs do not have any fixed rules—players discover the rules and the boundaries of the game through trial and error—and do not require players to assume fictional identities or roleplay beyond feigning belief in the reality of the characters they interact with (even if games where players play 'themselves' are a long-standing variant on the genre). Also, the This Is Not A Game aesthetic is distinctive to ARGs, not being present in the RPGs or LARPs.
 Massively multiplayer online role-playing games (MMORPGs). As outlined above with computer games and traditional role-playing games, non-player characters in ARGs are controlled by real people in real time, not by computer AI; ARGs do not generally require special software or interfaces to play; the games do not require players to roleplay or create characters or avatars; and ARGs generally use multiple media and real life in addition to the internet to distribute their narratives.
 Viral marketing. While ARGs are often used as a type of viral marketing, they diverge sharply from the philosophy behind "sponsored consumers" or other viral marketing practices that attempt to trick consumers into believing that planted shills for a product are other independent consumers. Similarly, they also diverge from sites or narratives that genuinely try to convince visitors that they are what they claim to be. Puppet-masters generally leave both subtle and overt clues to the game's fictional nature and boundaries where players can find them (e.g. through clearly fictional names on site registrations) and many ARGs openly flaunt obviously fictional plots. The puppet-masters of the genre's seminal example, the Beast,(see below) made it a point of pride never to pretend to be players in order to solicit publicity or nudge players along, and the Terms of Service of Unfiction, a community site for the ARG genre, strictly prohibit individuals involved in creating games from posting about them without disclosing their involvement.

Influences and precursors 
Due to factors like the curtain, attempts to begin games with "stealth launches" to fulfill the TINAG aesthetic, and the restrictive non-disclosure agreements governing how much information may be revealed by the puppet-masters of promotional games, the design process for many ARGs is often shrouded in secrecy, making it difficult to discern the extent to which they have been influenced by other works. In addition, the cross-media nature of the form allows ARGs to incorporate elements of so many other art forms and works that attempting to identify them all would be a nearly impossible task.

Possible inspirations from fiction and other art forms 
G. K. Chesterton's 1903 short story "The Tremendous Adventures of Major Brown" (part of a collection entitled The Club of Queer Trades) seems to predict the ARG concept. In the story, a company called the Adventure and Romance Agency, Limited, creates adventures for its clients.

John Fowles' 1965 novel The Magus describes an elaborate series of "masques" collectively called "the godgame", an ARG-like scenario that involves many players in several nations, on both sides of the curtain, all working under the direction of one puppet-master. not all of whom are aware of who the others are. The novel ends ambiguously, leaving the reader to literally choose the ending they prefer. In his foreword to the 1977 revised edition of The Magus, Fowles acknowledged some literary works that had influenced him, including Alain-Fournier's 1913 novel Le Grand Meaulnes ("The Lost Estate") for showing a secret hidden world to be explored, and Richard Jefferies' Bevis from 1882, for projecting a very different world.

In Thomas Pynchon's 1965 novel The Crying of Lot 49, the conspiracy may be an ARG set up by Pierce Inverarity to bedevil Oedipa Maas.

In Samuel R. Delany's 1976 science fiction novel Triton, the combination board and card game Vlet that many of the main characters play throughout the novel appears to be a type of ARG. The game's name was borrowed from a similar game in a short story by Joanna Russ titled "A Game of Vlet" from 1974.

Ludic texts such as the popular Choose Your Own Adventure or "Secret Path"  children's novels may also have provided some inspiration. The first of these, Edward Packard's Sugarcane Island, was published by R. A. Montgomery of Vermont Crossroads Press in 1976. This book's popularity launched the gamebook phenomenon and led to an extended series of titles that the pair, along with other authors, created for Bantam Books from 1979 through 1988.

Other possible antecedents include performance art and similar theatrical forms that attempt to directly engage the audience. One of the most popular examples of this genre is the live enactment of a murder mystery, in which theatrical participants interact with the audience. This idea dates to 1976, when a successful "murder mystery weekend" was held at the historic Mohonk Mountain House in New Paltz, New York, directed by Dilys Winn, the owner of the New York book shop, Murder Inc.

Reader-influenced online fiction such as AOL's QuantumLink Serial, by the American writer Tracy Reed, which ran from 1988 to 1989, provides a model that incorporates audience influence into the storytelling in a manner similar to that of ARGs. The story was free with a membership to AOL.

The One Game, a British television drama serial screened in 1988, was entirely based on the premise of the protagonist being forced to play an ARG (referred to as a "reality game" in the script).

In 1995, The Spot by Scott Zakarin debuted as an ad-supported site, adding photos and video to the original QuantumLink Serial model. It was highly successful and ran through 1997. In The Spot, the characters (called "Spotmates") kept near-daily online diaries (similar to what later came to be called blogs), responded to emails, and posted images of their current activities. In addition the site boasted short videos as well as photos relating to the diary entries. The fanbase on the site, or "Spotfans", interacted on a daily basis with the Spotmates and each other, discussing the newsworthy events.

Due to the influence that The Beast ARG from 2001 exerted over the form of later ARGs and the willingness of its creators to talk about its development, its sources of inspiration are both particularly relevant to the evolution of the modern ARG and somewhat more verifiable than other possible antecedents. Elan Lee, one of its creative principals, cites the 1997 movie The Game as an inspiration, as well as the Beatles' "Paul is dead" phenomenon. Sean Stewart, another of the three principal designers, notes that designing and running an ARG bears some similarities to running an RPG, and the influence of that particular game form is further suggested by the fact that Jordan Weisman, the game's third main designer, was also the founder of leading RPG company FASA. Stewart also noted that the sort of "creative, collaborative, enthusiastic scavenging behavior" upon which the Beast depended has its antecedents outside the arts: the Beast just "accidentally re-invented Science as pop culture entertainment."

The hallucinatory Turkish frontier across which A.W. Hill's Stephan Raszer tracks his quarry in the literary thriller Nowhere-Land from 2009 also bears similarities to an ARG.

Basic design principles 
ARGs are sometimes described as the first narrative art form native to the internet because their storytelling relies on the two main activities conducted there: searching for information, and sharing information.
 Storytelling as archaeology. Instead of presenting a chronologically unified, coherent narrative, designers scatter pieces of the story across the Internet and other media, allowing players to reassemble it, supply connective tissue and determine what it means.
 Platformless narrative. Stories are not bound to a single medium, but exist independently and use whatever media is available to make itself heard.
 Designing for a hive mind. While it might be possible to follow games individually, designs are directed at a collective of players that share information and solutions almost instantly and incorporate individuals possessing almost every conceivable area of expertise. While games might initially attract a small group of participants, as the participants come across new challenges they try to find others with the knowledge needed to overcome an obstacle.
 A whisper is sometimes louder than a shout. Rather than openly promoting games and trying to attract participation by "pushing" it toward potential players, designers attempt to "pull" players to the story by engaging in over-the-top secrecy, have elements of the game "warn" players away from them, and eschew traditional marketing channels. Designers do not communicate about the game with players or press while it is in play.
 The "this is not a game" (TINAG) aesthetic. ARGs themselves do not acknowledge that they are games. They do not have an acknowledged ruleset for players; as in real life, they determine the "rules" either through trial and error or by setting their own boundaries. Narratives present a fully realized world: any phone number or the email address mentioned works, and any website acknowledged exists. Games take place in real time and are not replayable. Characters function like real people, not game pieces, respond authentically, and are controlled by real people, not by computer AI. Some events involve meetings or live phone calls between players and actors.
 Real life as a medium. Games use players' lives as a platform. Players are not required to build a character or role-play being someone other than themselves. They might unexpectedly overcome a challenge for the community simply because of the real-life knowledge and background they possessed. Participants are constantly on the lookout for clues embedded in everyday life.
 Collaborative storytelling. While the puppet-masters control most of the story, they incorporate player content and respond to players' actions, analysis and speculation by adapting the narrative and intentionally leave "white space" for the players to fill in.
 Not a hoax. While the TINAG aesthetic might seem on the surface to be an attempt to make something indistinguishable from real life, there are both subtle and overt metacommunications in place to reveal a game's framework and most of its boundaries.

Scholarly views 
Overall, academics have been intrigued by ARGs' potential for effective organizing.  Across the board, a diverse range of organizations, such as businesses, nonprofits, government agencies, and schools "can learn from the best practices and lessons of ARGs to similarly take advantage of new media and collective problem–solving".  As such, implementation of ARGs in these different settings involves finding best practices for honing the collaborative, transmedia elements of ARGs for these respective institutions.

Much of this scholarly interest stems from the evolving media ecology with the rise of new media.  In sustaining cooperative online communities, ARGs build on "an alignment of interest, where problems are presented in a fashion that assists game designers in their goal while intriguing and aiding players in their goals".  This returns to ARGs' framework of transmedia storytelling, which necessitates that ARG designers relinquish a significant degree of their power to the ARG's audience, problematizing traditional views of authorship.

The majority of the scholarly review on ARGs analyzes their pedagogical advantages.  Notably, in the classroom, ARGs can be effective tools for providing exigence on given topics and yield a collaborative and experiential learning environment. By the same token, weaknesses of classroom learning through ARGs include the need for a flexible narrative conducive to collaborative learning in large groups and a sophisticated web design.

In a contribution to a volume focusing on play and cities in Springer's Gaming Media and Social Effects series, Eddie Duggan (2017) provides an overview of pervasive games, and discusses characteristics in ARGs, LARPs, RPGs, assassination games and other games where the notion of the "magic circle" as elaborated by Salen and Zimmerman is confounded.

Development and history

Early examples 
Ong's Hat / Incunabula was most likely started sometime around 1993, and also included most of the aforementioned design principles. Ong's Hat also incorporated elements of legend tripping into its design, as chronicled in a scholarly work titled "Legend-Tripping Online: Supernatural Folklore and the Search for Ong's Hat". Some scholars disagree on the classification of the Ong's Hat story.

In 1996, Wizards of the Coast launched a proto-alternate reality game called Webrunner: The Hidden Agenda to promote their game Netrunner. It cast players as hackers through seven puzzle-themed "gates" to get the secret data ("agenda"). The popular game was the first online game tied into a product release, making the front page of The New York Times technology section. A sequel, Webrunner II: The Forbidden Code, followed on to promote the release of the Proteus expansion of the game.

Dreadnot was a (non-commercial) ARG produced with a grant from the San Francisco Chronicle and published on sfgate.com in 1996. It included most of the aforementioned design principles. The game included working voice mail phone numbers for characters, clues in the source code, character email addresses, off-site websites, real locations in San Francisco, real people (including then-Mayor Willie Brown), and of course a fictional mystery.

In 1997, a year prior to the release of Douglas Adams' computer game Starship Titanic, The Digital Village launched a website purporting to be that of an intergalactic travel agency called Starlight Travel, which in the game is the Starship Titanic's parent company. The site combined copious amounts of Monty Python-esque writing (by Michael Bywater) with ARG-type interactivity.

The marketing for the 1999 movie The Blair Witch Project resembled ARGs in many ways (and some of its makers went on to create the 2005 Audi promotional ARG The Art of the Heist), expanding the world of the movie online, adding backstory, and treating the fiction as reality through real-world media such as fliers and a fake documentary on the Sci-Fi Channel. However, perhaps in part due to the subject material and the absence of overt metacommunications that this was fiction, it also resembles an internet hoax or attempts to create an urban legend.

Pervasive play games like the Go Game and the Nokia Game also incorporated many elements similar to ARGs (although they tended to lack the narrative element central to ARGs) and prefigured the public play components of large-scale corporate ARGs like I Love Bees, The Art of the Heist and Last Call Poker.

Electronic Arts' Majestic began development in 1999, although it didn't launch until after the Beast had concluded, in 2001. Featuring phone calls, emails, and other media that involved players in a multiplatform narrative, the game was eventually canceled due to lack of players. This was due to many factors, ranging from the monthly subscription fee (as part of Electronic Arts' EA Online venture) to Majestic unfortunate timing and subject matter in relation to the September 11 attacks on the World Trade Center. Many players also criticized the absence of the TINAG principle (e.g. in-game phone calls were preceded by an announcement that they were part of the game, although these announcements were optional based on user preference).

The Beast 

In 2001, in order to market the movie A.I. Artificial Intelligence directed by Steven Spielberg that finished Stanley Kubrick's unfinished project to adapt Brian Aldiss's short story "Supertoys Last All Summer Long", and also a planned series of Microsoft computer games based on the film, Microsoft's Creative Director Jordan Weisman and another Microsoft game designer, Elan Lee, conceived of an elaborate murder mystery played out across hundreds of websites, email messages, faxes, fake ads, and voicemail messages. They hired Sean Stewart, an award-winning science fiction/fantasy author, to write the story and Pete Fenlon, an experienced adventure game "worldbuilder," to serve as developer and content lead. The game, dubbed "the Citizen Kane of online entertainment" by Internet Life, was a runaway success that involved over three million active participants from all over the world during its run and would become the seminal example of the nascent ARG genre. An early asset list for the project contained 666 files, prompting the game's puppet-masters to dub it "the Beast", a name which was later adopted by players. A large and extremely active fan community called the Cloudmakers formed to analyze and participate in solving the game, and the combined intellect, tenacity and engagement of the group soon forced the puppet-masters to create new subplots, devise new puzzles, and alter elements of the design to keep ahead of the player base. Somewhat unusual for a computer-based game, the production drew players from a wide spectrum of age groups and backgrounds.

Although the Beast ran for only three months, it prompted the formation of a highly organized and intensely engaged community that remained active years after the game concluded. Perhaps more significantly, it inspired a number of its participants to create games adapting and expanding the model, extending it from an anomalous one-time occurrence to a new genre of entertainment and allowing the community to grow even after the Beast itself concluded. Members of the Cloudmakers group went on to form ARGN, the primary news source for the genre, and Unfiction, its central community hub, as well as designing the first successful and widely played indie ARGs, such as LockJaw and Metacortechs, and corporate efforts such as Perplex City.

Portal (video game franchise) 
On March 1 and March 3 of 2010, Portal was updated to include a promotional ARG for its then-upcoming sequel, Portal 2. It was created by the Portal 2 development team, and while it was mostly made to discover the next entry in the Portal franchise, it also included a way to extend the Portal universe. Portal was updated at 2:33 PST, with the update's description reading "Changed radio transmission frequency to comply with federal and state spectrum management regulations". The update also added a single achievement, named "Transmission Received". The update added 26 portable radios placed throughout the game's levels, which played a default song until placed in a specific location in their respective maps. When placed in their location, the radio's lights changed from red to green, and they began to emit a string of Morse code, which revealled hidden images when decoded with Robot 36. The numbers from the images form the BBS phone number "(425) 822-5251" and when you dial into the BBS it will prompt the user asking for a login. Entering the username "backup" and the password "backup" (from the 12th audio file) will show text saying "Aperture Laboratories GLaDOS v3.11", followed by "Copyright (c) 1973–1997 Aperture – All Rights Reserved" then will proceed to show the user ASCII art images and paragraphs quoting Cave Johnson. If the person is idle for 4 minutes, the following text will say "Hey! Please login now. You have one minute left." and if left idle for one more minute the next text will say "Your login time (5 minutes) ran out. Goodbye", disconnecting the user.

Portal was updated again on March 3, 2010, at 2:24 PST with the description "Added valuable asset retrieval", The game ending was retconned to add the Party Escort bot, who dragged the player back into the enrichment center rather than allowing them to escape. setting up the events of Portal 2.

Community and genre growth 
The years immediately after the Beast saw independent developers who had played it extend the form from a one-time occurrence to a new genre of gaming, and the formation of an ever-growing community devoted to playing, designing and discussing ARGs.

Grassroots development 
Influenced heavily by the Beast and enthusiastic about the power of collaboration, several Cloudmakers came together with the idea that they could create a similar game. The first effort to make an independent Beast-like game, Ravenwatchers, failed, but another team soon assembled and met with greater success. With very little experience behind them, the group managed, after nine months of development, to create a viable game that was soon seized upon eagerly by the Cloudmakers group and featured in Wired magazine. As players of the Beast, members of the Lockjaw development team were extremely aware of the community playing the game and took steps to encourage the tight bonding of the player base through highly collaborative puzzles, weekly Euchre games, and the inclusion of player personas in the game. While the numbers never rivaled those of The Beast, the game proved both that it was possible for developers to create these games without corporate funding or promotion, and that there was interest in the ARG form beyond a one-time audience for a production on the Beast's scale. Lockjaw marked the start of the ARG as a genre of gaming, rather than simply a one-time occurrence.

Shortly before Lockjaw's conclusion, players discovered a game that seemed to revolve around the movie Minority Report. Despite speculation to the contrary, the game (known as Exocog) was not an official promotion for the film, but an experiment in interactive storytelling by Jim Miller. Inspired by the independent Lockjaw effort, Dave Szulborski introduced ChangeAgents, a spinoff of EA's failed Majestic ARG, to the ARGN audience, then followed it with two additional installments. During this time, Szulborski also created a successful grassroots game not based on the Majestic universe, called Chasing the Wish. Just before the release of the third and the final Matrix movie, the team that developed Lockjaw launched Metacortechs, an ARG based on that universe. The fan fiction effort was very successful, reached a larger and more active player base than many professionally produced games, and was at first assumed by many to be an officially sanctioned promotion for the movie. Metacortechs was followed by an ever-increasing number of grassroots ARGs.

In the wake of these successful, low-budget independent ARGs, an active "grassroots" development community began to evolve within the genre. While the quality of the grassroots games varies wildly, amateur storytellers, web designers, and puzzle creators continue to provide independently developed ARGs for the active player community.

Community development 
The term "alternate reality gaming" was first used by Sean Stacey, one of the moderators of the Lockjaw player community, in the Trail for that game. Stacey and Steve Peters, another of the moderators, created the two websites that have become the central hub of the ARG community: ARGN and UnFiction. Due to their efforts, when Lockjaw ended, the players had a new community resource allowing them to assemble to play the games that were soon to follow. UnFiction had over 32,000 members before its closing due to server costs. ARGN employs a staff of 15 volunteer writers to report on new games and other topics of interest to the community, as well as producing a weekly netcast.

A first experience in video games 
Although not considered as a pure alternate reality game, Missing Since January ("In Memoriam" in Europe) is a video game based on the same principles that appear in an ARG: an online enquiry, the game entering into the players real-life environment, willingly confusing reality and fiction (real fact-based sites, emails...). Developed from 1999 onwards by the French studio Lexis Numérique, Missing Since January was launched by Ubisoft in Europe in October 2003 and by Dreamcatcher in the US in January 2004. In Missing Since January, using the internet, the player must attempt to decode a mysterious CD ROM broadcast by the police in order to find two missing people abducted by a serial killer. More than a hundred sites were created for this purpose. By and large, as the player advances in the inquiry, they are contacted by different characters that send emails. The follow-up, which appeared in 2006 under the title Evidence: The Last Ritual ("In Memoriam 2, The Last Ritual" in Europe) also allowed players to receive text messages and to speak on the phone with certain characters in the game.

Gathering worldwide gamers 

Because of their similarities, video games and ARGs continued to be associated through many projects, In 2009, Funcom, a game development studio from Oslo, Norway, hid a gate on its corporate website, which led to an ARG which would be part of the pre-launch campaign for The Secret World, a game released in 2013. The gate was discovered only in 2013, therefore requiring the puppet-master to adapt the scenario to its actual setting.

Funcom has done a total of 16 ARGs that tie in with The Secret World, with the first one starting in May 2007. The ARGs focussed on several different storylines, such as: The Expedition of Roald Amundsen, The Sanctuary of Secrets and the Secret War.

The company behind Funcom's last 2 ARGs, Human Equation, a Montreal-based entertainment studio who also created an independent ARG called Qadhos, has even further purchased the rights to a special class of characters, The Black Watchmen, to create their own independent ARG. A spin-off of Human Equation, Alice & Smith, released the game in June 2015.

Massive-scale commercial games and mainstream attention 
After the success of the first major entries in the nascent ARG genre, a number of large corporations looked to ARGs to both promote their products, and to enhance their companies' images by demonstrating their interest in innovative and fan-friendly marketing methods. To create buzz for the launch of the Xbox game Halo 2, Microsoft hired the team that had created the Beast, now operating independently as 42 Entertainment. The result, I Love Bees, departed radically from the website-hunting and puzzle-solving that had been the focus of the Beast. I Love Bees wove together an interactive narrative set in 2004, and a War of the Worlds-style radio drama set in the future, the latter of which was broken into 30–60-second segments and broadcast over ringing payphones worldwide. The game pushed players outdoors to answer phones, create and submit content, and recruit others, and received as much or a more mainstream notice than its predecessor, finding its way onto television during a presidential debate, and becoming one of The New York Times catchphrases of 2004.

As such, I Love Bees captivated enough fans to garner significant press attention, and partly because of this publicity, Halo 2 "sold $125 million in copies the first day of release."  A slew of imitators fan tributes and parodies followed. In 2005, a pair of articles profiling 42 Entertainment appeared in Game Developer magazine and the East Bay Express, both of which tied into an ARG created by the journalist and his editors.

The following spring, Audi launched The Art of the Heist, developed by Audi ad agency McKinney+Silver, Haxan Films (creators of The Blair Witch Project), to promote its new A3.

Roughly a year after I Love Bees, 42 Entertainment produced Last Call Poker, a promotion for Activision's video game Gun. Designed to help modern audiences connect with the Western genre, Last Call Poker centered on a working poker site, held games of "Tombstone Hold 'Em" in cemeteries around the United States—as well as in at least one digital venue, World of Warcrafts own virtual reality cemetery – and sent players to their own local cemeteries to clean up neglected grave sites and perform other tasks.

At the end of 2005, the International Game Developers Association ARG Special Interest Group was formed "to bring together those already designing, building, and running ARGs, in order to share knowledge, experience, and ideas for the future." More recently, an ARG was created by THQ for the game Frontlines: Fuel of War around peak oil theories where the world is in a crisis over diminishing oil resources.

In 2008, the American Art Museum hosted an alternate reality game, called Ghosts of a Chance, which was created by City Mystery. The game allowed patrons "a new way of engaging with the collection" in the Luce Foundation Center. The game ran for six weeks and attracted more than 6,000 participants.

The rise of the self-supporting ARG 
As the genre has grown, there has been increasing interest in exploring models that provide funding for large-scale ARGs that are neither promotions for other products nor limited by the generally small budget of grassroots/indie games. The two major trends that have emerged in this area support through the sale of products related to the game, and fees for participation in the game. A third possible model is one using in-game advertising for other products, as in The Lost Experience, but at this time no large-scale game has attempted to fund itself solely through in-game advertising.

The first major attempt (other than EA's failed Majestic) to create a self-supporting ARG was Perplex City, which launched in 2005 after a year's worth of teasers. The ARG offered a $200,000 prize to the first player to locate the buried Receda Cube and was funded by the sale of puzzle cards. The first season of the game ended in January 2007, when Andy Darley found the Receda Cube at Wakerly Great Wood in Northamptonshire, UK. Mind Candy, the production company, has also produced a board game related to the ARG and plans to continue it with a second season beginning 1 March 2007. This model was delayed till 1 June, and has again, been delayed to an unspecified date. Mind Candy's acceptance of corporate sponsorship and venture capital suggests that the puzzle cards alone are not enough to fully fund the ARG at this time.

In March 2006, Elan Lee and Dawne Weisman founded edoc laundry, a company designed to produce ARGs using clothes as the primary platform. Consumers decipher the codes hidden within the garments and input the results into the game's main website to reveal pieces of a story about the murder of a band manager.

Reviving the pay-to-play model, Studio Cypher launched the first chapter of its "multiplayer novel" in May 2006. Each "chapter" is a mini-ARG for which participants who pay the $10 registration fee receive earlier access to information and greater opportunities to interact with characters than non-paying participants. VirtuQuest, a well-known corporate team, also attempted a pay-to-play model with Township Heights later in the year, but despite initial enthusiasm on the part of the ARG community, the game was not well-received due to the design team's use of player Hybrid-Names based on their real-life names. Also, the short run time frame was not appreciated by some seasoned players.

In June 2006, Catching the Wish launched from an in-game website about comic books based on its predecessor, 2003's Chasing the Wish. 42 Entertainment released Cathy's Book, by Sean Stewart and Jordan Weisman, in October 2006, shifting the central medium of this ARG from the internet to the printed page. The young-adult novel contains an "evidence packet" and expands its universe through websites and working phone numbers, but is also a stand-alone novel that essentially functions as an individually playable ARG. Neither the cost of creating the book nor sales figures are available (although it made both American and British bestseller lists) to determine whether the project was successfully self-funded.

It is difficult to judge the efficacy of self-funded ARG models at this time, but it seems likely that exploration of ways to fund large-scale ARGs without using them as marketing for other products will continue as the genre grows.

The serious ARG 
In a 2007 article, columnist Chris Dahlen (of Pitchfork Media) voiced a much-discussed ARG concept: if ARGs can spark players to solve very hard fictional problems, could the games be used to solve real-world problems? Dahlen was writing about World Without Oil, the first ARG centered on a serious near-future scenario: a global oil shortage. Another ARG, Tomorrow Calling, appears to be a testbed for a future project focused on environmental themes and activism.

Serious ARGs introduce plausibility as a narrative feature to pull players into the game. People participate to experience, prepare for or shape an alternative life or future. The games thus have the potential to attract casual or non-players, because 'what if' is a game anyone can play. Serious ARGs may, therefore, be sponsored by organizations with activist or educational goals; World Without Oil was a joint project of the Public Broadcasting Service's Independent Lens and its Electric Shadows Web-original programming.

Their serious subject matter may lead Serious ARGs to diverge from mainstream ARGs in design. Instead of challenging collective intelligence to solve a game mastered puzzle, World Without Oil's puppet-masters acted as players to guide the "collective imagination" to create a multi-authored chronicle of the alternative future, purportedly as it was happening. By asking players to chronicle their lives in the oil-shocked alternative reality, the WWO game relinquished narrative control to players to a degree not seen before in an ARG.

In October 2008 The British Red Cross created a serious ARG called Traces of Hope to promote their campaign about civilians caught up in conflict.

There are possible future Serious ARGs described in fiction. In his novel Halting State, Charles Stross foresightedly describes a number of possible ARGs, where players engage in seemingly fictional covert spy operations.

In 2008 the European Union funded an ARG to support motivation for multilingualism within European secondary school students called ARGuing for Multilingual Motivation in Web 2.0. As noted above in World Without Oil, to complete this ARG it was necessary to move away from the strict definitions of an ARG as listed. The ARG was by invitation only and players (students) knew they were going to play a game. This project is now completed and papers on the project and the resources produced for education (a Methodology and Teacher Training guides) are available and have been presented at the 3rd European Conference on Games Based Learning.

In 2008–2009 the MacArthur Foundation supported an ARG The Black Cloud to teach US high-school students about indoor air quality. The project is active and allows teachers to rent sophisticated air quality sensors to run the game locally.

The USC School of Cinematic Arts has run a semester-long ARG called Reality Ends Here for incoming freshmen since 2011. The game involves players collaborating and competing to produce media artifacts. In 2012, Reality Ends Here won the Impact Award at IndieCade, presented to games which "have social message, shift the cultural perception of games as a medium, represent a new play paradigm, expand the audience, or influence culture."

UCLA Film Department had its first alternate reality game class, taught by game designer/writer Flint Dille in 2011 Winter Semester. The Class Built an ARG in one semester, culminating in a real world event which resolved the story.

The Plan of Gauss was a game developed as a didactic strategy to enhance the learning and understanding of mathematics in university students. In this game, the players had to help characters (students) to find a missing friend.

New developments 
2006 produced fewer large-scale corporate ARGs than past years, but the ARG form continued to spread and be adapted for promotional uses, as an increasing number of TV shows and movies extended their universes onto the internet through such means as character blogs and ARG-like puzzle trails, and as an increasing number of independent and grassroots games launched, with varying levels of success. One of the more popular indie ARGs to launch in the fall of 2006 was Jan Libby's dark yet whimsical "Sammeeeees". "MeiGest", produced by Hazel Grian and Jon Williams, garnered a great deal of community attention and affection with a light, humorous storyline and numerous references to past ARGs. lonelygirl15, a popular series of videos on YouTube, relinquished an unprecedented amount of control to its audience by recognizing a fan-created game as the "official" ARG. In December 2006, another indie ARG launched called "Bristel Goodman" which featured creative yet creepy videos made by an internet killer. Eddie Dees, the fictional character who is being sent these videos, posted them at YouTube and other video sharing sites, asking for help. The ARG community responded and the game began. As of March 2013, the game continues as obsessed players search for the truth about RHINO.

In August 2006, Hoodlum produced PSTRIXI for Yahoo!7 Australia. PSTRIXI was designed around a young DJ Trixi and her boyfriend Hamish. Players were engaged across all of Yahoo! 7's platforms and asked to help solve the mystery of Trixi's missing sister Max. The multi-platform ARG ran for 12 weeks and used websites, email, Yahoo!360 forums, Yahoo Radio, and viral television to engage the audience in the game. PSTRIXI was a major success with the Yahoo!7 community; players spent an average of 16 minutes per session on the websites and returned more than once a week.

2007 got off to a strong start immediately, with Microsoft's Vanishing Point to promote the launch of Windows Vista. The game was designed by 42 Entertainment and, due in part to many large-scale real-world events, such as a lavish show at the Bellagio Fountain in Las Vegas as well as a prizes of a trip into space and having a winner's name engraved on all AMD Athlon 64 FX chips for a certain period of time, received large media attention. It was followed almost immediately by another 42 Entertainment production for the release of the Nine Inch Nails album Year Zero, in which fans discovered leaked songs on thumb drives in washrooms at concerts, as well as clues to websites that describe a dystopian future occurring in 2022. Year Zero, in turn, bled out into the real world through players flyering neighborhoods and creating graffiti supporting the game's fictitious Art Is Resistance movement.   Monster Hunter Club, a promotion for the U.S. release of the movie The Host, launched by sending action figures and other items to prominent members of the ARG community. Perplex City concluded its first season by awarding a $200,000 prize to a player who found the game's missing cube. They planned to continue the ARG into a second "season" under the name Perplex City Stories without a large grand prize, but it was ultimately cancelled.

The teaser site for World Without Oil, the first major "Serious ARG", was unveiled in March 2007; the game itself launched on 30 April and ran through 1 June, gathering over 1500 videos, images, blog entries and voice mails to document the "Oil Crisis of 2007."

In May 2007, 42 Entertainment launched Why So Serious, an ARG to promote the feature film The Dark Knight. Hailed as being the single most impressive viral marketing campaign of all-time, it played out over 15 months, concluding in July 2008. Millions of players in 177 countries participated both online and taking part in live events, and it reached hundreds of millions through Internet buzz and exposure.  Notably, Why So Serious prompted a great deal of collaborative organizing and action; players went to the streets campaigning for Harvey Dent and gathered in New York City as a part of gameplay.

In March 2008, McDonald's and the IOC launched Find The Lost Ring, a global ARG promoting the 2008 Summer Olympics in Beijing, China. The game was run simultaneously in six languages with new story lines developing in each, encouraging players to communicate with residents of other countries to facilitate sharing of clues and details of the game as a whole. American track and field athlete Edwin Moses acted as a celebrity Game Master, and McDonald's Corporation promised to donate US$100,000 to Ronald McDonald House Charities China on behalf of the players.

February 2009 saw the launch of the ARG Something In The Sea, designed to promote the videogame BioShock 2 by immersing players in character Mark Meltzer's quest to find his missing daughter. In addition to the messages, documents, photos, and puzzles on the website, those following along on 8 August 2009, were given the coordinates of 10 beaches worldwide and told to go there at dawn. Those who did found objects planted by the game runners designed to look like they had washed ashore from BioShock fictional underwater city of Rapture. Players who wrote letters to Mark, whose address was advertised on the website, also sometimes received items such as wine bottles, records, or masks.

On 1 March 2010, Valve released an update via Steam to their game Portal, adding a nondescript new achievement and some .wav files hidden within the game GCFs. The .wav files actually contained morse code and SSTV encoded images, some including certain numbers and letters. When pieced together in the correct order, these numbers and letters formed a 32-bit MD5 hash of a BBS phone number. When traced, it was found to originate from Kirkland, Washington, where Valve was based before moving to Bellevue, Washington in 2003. Accessing the number as a bulletin board system yielded large ASCII art images, all leading towards the announcement of the game's sequel, Portal 2. Later, prior to release of Portal 2 in 2011, a much more expansive ARG called the Potato Sack was run, arranged by a number of independent developers working with Valve, to simulate the re-booting of GLaDOS. The ARG resulted in the game being released several hours earlier than scheduled, among other details.

Also launched in March 2010, an ARG produced by David Varela at nDreams featured the 2008 Formula 1 World Champion Lewis Hamilton; entitled Lewis Hamilton: Secret Life, the game ran throughout the 2010 Formula 1 season, in nine languages, with live events in a dozen cities around the world.

In July 2013, Walt Disney Imagineering Research & Development and The Walt Disney Studios launched The Optimist,  built around "a story of Walt Disney, the Imagineers, and other visionary thinkers and their potential involvement in a secret project that sought to build a better future."  The game culminated at the D23 Expo in Anaheim, Calif., August 9–11, 2013. Players participated over a six-week period, using social media, mobile devices, and apps, while visiting locations from the story in and around Los Angeles.

An ARG accompanying the Kickstarter campaign for Frog Fractions 2 began in March 2014 and completed in 2016. Frog Fractions 2 will be the sequel to Twinbeard Studio's much acclaimed Frog Fractions, although the ARG itself is often referred to as Frog Fractions 1.5 in reference to an in-ARG puzzle solution. The ARG took about two years to solve, involving clues buried in 23 independent games and real-life locations, allowing the game, secretly already uploaded under the guise of a different game, to become unlocked in December 2016.

On the release of the expansion Afterbirth for The Binding of Isaac: Rebirth in October 2015, players discover clues hinting towards an ARG related to the game, based on the community's previous attempts to hack the game to discover any secret characters. The ARG included location information near Santa Cruz, California, where the game's developer Edmund McMillen lived. The ARG was successfully completed in November 2015, with the community working together and enabling a new character and additional content to be unlocked for the game.

Oddworld Inhabitants has started an ARG in anticipation of their newest game Oddworld: Soulstorm and tasked fans with finding a mysterious entity, which would later turn out to be a character named Ed – a Mudokon slave who is speculated to be working in Necrum mines. A second website was then discovered showing existence of a Mudokon resistance formed after Abe shut down RuptureFarms and rescued his brothers during the events of Oddworld: Abe's Oddysee.

On June 12, 2020, the band Twenty One Pilots started an ARG based on their new song "Level of Concern." The ARG contained a series of 20 codes that each led to a downloadable file. In the files, were pictures and videos of the band and clues for the next codes. To receive the 20th code, fans will have to wait until June 15, 2020.

Inscryption, a video game by Daniel Mullins based on a metafiction narrative, including a post-game ARG that involved real-world clues and references to Mullins' past games in conjunction with in-game materials, leading to additional narrative and endings for the game.

In December 2020, a long-unsolved puzzle from Perplex City, Billion to One, was solved. The puzzle focused on exploring the concept of Six degrees of separation by presenting a man's photograph and his first name, "Satoshi", asking players to locate him. In 2020, Tom-Lucas Säger used image recognition software and located Satoshi, reporting it to Laura E. Hall, who ran the website tracking information about the hunt. In 2022, a documentary, Finding Satoshi, explored the Perplex City puzzle and its solution.

Television tie-ins and "extended experiences" 
Before the development of the ARG genre, television sought to extend the reality of its shows onto the web with websites that treated their world as real, rather than discussing it as fiction. An early example was Fox's Freakylinks, developed by Haxan, creators of The Blair Witch Project, who would later go on to develop the well-known ARGs The Art of the Heist and Who Is Benjamin Stove. Freakylinks employed a website designed to look like it had been created by amateur paranormal enthusiasts to generate internet interest in the show, which gathered a cult following but was canceled after 13 episodes. In September 2002, following a successful initial foray into ARG-like territory with 2001's Alias web game, ABC brought alternate reality gaming more definitively to the television screen with the show Push, Nevada. Produced and co-written by Ben Affleck, the show created a fictional city in Nevada, named Push. When advertising the show, LivePlanet advertised the city instead, with billboards, news reports, company sponsors, and other realistic life-intruding forms. During each episode of the show, highly cryptic clues would be revealed on screen, while other hidden clues could be found on the city's website. The show was canceled mid-season, and all of the remaining clues were released to the public. Clever watchers eventually figured out that the show would still be paying out its $1 million prizes during Monday Night Football. The last clue was revealed during half-time, prompting those fortunate enough to have solved the puzzle to call a telephone number. The first person to call received $1 million. In October 2004, the ReGenesis extended reality game launched in tandem with the Canadian television series ReGenesis. Produced by Xenophile Media in association with Shaftesbury Films, clues and stories from the series sent players online to stop a bioterrorist attack.

In 2006, the TV tie-in ARG began to come into its own when there was a surge of ARGs that extended the worlds of related television shows onto the Internet and into the real world. As with Push, Nevada, ABC led the way, launching three TV tie-in ARGs in 2006: Kyle XY, Ocular Effect (for the show Fallen) and The Lost Experience (for the show Lost). ABC joined with Channel 4 in the UK and Australia's Channel 7 in promoting a revamped website for The Hanso Foundation. The site was focused on a fictitious company prevalent in the storyline of the TV series, and the game was promoted through television advertisements run during Lost episodes. The Fallen Alternate Reality Game was launched in tandem with the Fallen TV movie for ABC Family and was originally conceived by Matt Wolf and created by Matt Wolf (Double Twenty Productions) in association with Xenophile Media. Wolf accepted the Emmy for The Fallen Alternate Reality Game at the 59th Annual Primetime Creative Arts Emmy Awards on September 8, 2007.

NBC followed suit in January 2007, beginning an ARG for its hit TV series Heroes
launched through an in-show reference to the website for Primatech Paper, a company from the show, which turned out to be real. Text messages and emails led players who applied for "employment" at the site to secret files on the show's characters.

In May 2007, the BBC commissioned Kudos and Hoodlum to produce an interactive ARG for their flagship drama series Spooks, Spooks Interactive. The game enlists players to become MI5 agents who join the Section D team on missions crucial to the security of the UK and launched on 26 September. In 2008 it won the Interactivity Award at the British Academy Television Awards and the Interactive Innovation – Content Award at the British Academy Craft Awards.

The 9 November 2007 episode of Numb3rs entitled "Primacy" featured alternate reality gaming, and launched the ARG Chain Factor, which centered on players using a flash-based puzzle game to unknowingly destroy the world's economy on the whim of one of the characters from the "Primacy" episode.

In January 2008, BBC launched "Whack the Mole" for the CBBC show M.I. High, in which viewers are asked to become M.I. High field agents and complete tasks to capture a mole that has infiltrated the organization.

CBS made an ARG for Jericho to promote the series in 2007.

On 16 March 2011, BitTorrent promoted an open licensed version of the feature film Zenith in the United States. Users who downloaded the BitTorrent client software were also encouraged to download and share Part One of three parts of the film. On 4 May 2011, Part Two of the film was made available on VODO. The episodic release of the film, supplemented by an ARG transmedia marketing campaign, created a viral effect and over a million users downloaded the movie.

USA Network sponsored a game in 2016 for the TV show Mr. Robot, that started with a phone number shown on a box in a video clip. Prizes were awarded to the first 509 solvers.

That same year, Gravity Falls creator Alex Hirsch conducted an ARG called Cipher Hunt. Hirsch started the game with the posting of an initial clue on his Twitter account, followed by the rules. It lasted from July to August 2016, and its goal was to find the clues hidden in various places around the world leading to the location of a statue of  Bill Cipher. Said statue could be seen briefly after the ending credits of the series finale.

In 2021, the Doctor Who bosses began an ARG called FindTheDoctor. The game initially began on 26 July with the San Diego Comic Con panel revealing the trailer for Series 13, in which at the very end screen a barely visible "/mystery" was written at the bottom, which lead to a page on the Doctor Who website containing the "Welcome to a mystery across space and time. Work together to solve the hiDden clues and reveal a password below. #FindTheDoctor It begins: 13:13.13". Real enough on 13 August at the time 13:13, a new "hidden" video was added to the Doctor Who YouTube Channel, again containing the a message at the end, this time the letter C. The clues extended to Google Maps as well as to museums around the United Kingdom and the ultimate goal was to uncover a password for a locked page on the Doctor Who website.  The entire thing was made up in order to engage fans around the world in anticipation for the upcoming Series 13, the final adventures of the then-current Thirteenth Doctor actor Jodie Whittaker and showrunner Chris Chibnall.

Permanent ARG 
ARG are traditionally punctual events, mostly because they first appeared as promotional stunts and as their reactive nature requires massive resources to keep running. However, Alice & Smith, the company behind Funcom and Warhammer 40,000: Eternal Crusade started a crowdfunding campaign in 2014 to create a "permanent" ARG (PARG) called The Black Watchmen, which would run until players stop subscribing and funding the project. The campaign started with a smaller ARG in which a player flew from Dallas to Montreal to live the final mission in real-life. The results of the crowdfunding campaign can be seen on Kickstarter, and the game was released on Steam in June 2015.

The permanent ARG HUMINT by Cold Code Labs claimed to follow in the footsteps of The Black Watchmen as a persistent ARG while adding location-based mobile game technology, in a Cold War-themed setting. Meta-Earth is a permanent ARG that was released in April 2022 and allows players to roll-in their character from other alternate reality games. It is developed by Ten Rings.

Awards won 

ARGs have been recognized by the mainstream entertainment world: The Ocular Effect, an ARG promoting the TV movie The Fallen and produced in the autumn of 2007 by Xenophile Media Inc. was awarded a Primetime Emmy for Outstanding Achievement for an Interactive Television Program.  Xenophile Media Inc.'s ReGenesis Extended Reality Game won an International Interactive Emmy Award in 2007 and in April 2008 The Truth About Marika won the iEmmy for Best Interactive TV service. The British Academy of Film and Television Arts recognizes Interactivity as a category in the British Academy Television Awards.

Likewise, Year Zero was widely heralded following its release.  Such acclaim is signified in the ARG's Grand Prix Cyber Lions award, viewed as "the most prestigious of all advertising awards," at Cannes.  Adweek published a quote from the selection committee on the award decision, explaining that "42 Entertainment's [viral campaign for Nine Inch Nails] impressed the jury because of its use of a variety of media, from outdoor to guerrilla to online, and how digital [media] can play a central role of a big idea campaign."

In turn, Why So Serious also won a Grand Prix Award, alongside a Webby for interactive advertising.  World Without Oil was recognized for its achievements, too, earning the Activism award at the 2008 SXSW Web Awards.

Project Architeuthis, created for the U.S. Navy as a recruiting device for its cryptology division, won numerous awards, including the 2015 Warc Grand Prix for Social Strategy.

See also 
 List of alternate reality games
 History of alternate reality games
 Legend tripping
 Live-action game
 Live-action virtual reality game
 Metaverse
 Mixed reality game
 Pervasive game
 QAnon
 Transmedia storytelling
 Transreality gaming
 Verisimilitude

Notes

External links 

 ARGology – International Game Developers Association Alternate Reality Game Special Interest Group
 Lateral Realities – Lateral Realities

Alternate reality games
Immersive entertainment